The Palace on the Isle, also known as Baths Palace, is a classicist palace in Warsaw's Royal Baths Park, the city's largest park, occupying over 76 hectares of the city center.

From 1674 the property and the nearby Ujazdów Castle belonged to Count Stanisław Herakliusz Lubomirski, who commissioned a Baroque bath house called "Łazienka", similarly to a number of other European historic sites, including England's city of Bath. The building, erected on a square plan, was richly decorated with stuccos, statues, and paintings; some of the original decorations and architectural details survive.

In 1766 King Stanislaus Augustus purchased the estate and converted the bathing pavilion into a classicist summer residence, with an English garden.

During the final stages of World War II, the retreating Germans devastated the interior of the Palace and drilled holes in the structure in preparation for destruction. However, the plan was never carried out.

History

The building began as a bathhouse for Stanisław Herakliusz Lubomirski, owner of adjacent Ujazdów Castle. After 1678 the Lubomirski palace complex in Ujazdów, was enriched with four park pavilions: Arcadia, Hermitage, Frascati and the largest of them the Bathhouse. The marble building was constructed before 1683 according to design by Tylman Gamerski. Finished in 1689, it was intended to serve as a bathhouse, habitable pavilion and a garden grotto. Interiors of the newly built structure were embellished with profuse stucco decorations, also designed by Gamerski. Among the decorations were water deities (like Nereus), surrounding the main decorational feature of the pavilion - the fountain. Other chambers had richly decorated plafonds and supraportes, while the walls were covered with Delft tiles. The façades and interiors were decorated with sculptures, reliefs, Latin inscriptions (Musa Dryas, Nymphaeque boves et Pastor Apollo / Hic maneant, fugiat diva Minerva domus - Muse, dryad and nymphs, bullocks and Apollo the shepherd let stay here, the divine Minerva let disdain this house on the portal of the southern façade) and Lubomirski coat of arms - Szreniawa.

King Stanislaus Augustus decided to convert it into private quarters, and it was remodeled by Domenico Merlini between 1764 and 1795. During World War II, the Germans drilled holes into the walls for explosives but never got around to blowing up the palace. Afterwards the palace served as a barracks.

Architecture

The palace is built on an artificial island that divides the lake into two parts, a smaller northern lake and a larger southern one. The palace is connected to the surrounding park by two Ionic colonnaded bridges. The façades are unified by an entablature carried by giant Corinthian pilasters that link its two floors and are crowned by a balustrade that bears statues of mythologic figures. The north façade is relieved by a central pedimented portico. On the south front, a deep central recess lies behind a screen of Corinthian columns.

Interiors

On the palace's ground floor is the Bacchus Room, decorated with 17th-century Dutch blue tiles and a painting by Jacob Jordaens depicting Silenus and Bacchantes. The 1778 ceiling painting, Bacchus, Ceres, Venus and Cupid by Jan Bogumił Plersch, was burned by German forces in 1944. The Rotunda, designed by Domenico Merlini, occupies the central portion of the palace. Decorated in yellow and white marble, with figures of the Polish kings, it is one of the most important examples of neoclassical decoration within the palace. It leads to the Bath Room and the Ballroom.

On the other side of the Rotunda is the lower Picture Gallery, which contains works by Rubens and Rembrandt, and the chapel. Also on the ground floor is the Dining Room in which the famous Thursday Dinners took place, to which King Stanislaus Augustus invited leading Freemasons and other notables of the Polish Enlightenment. Its furniture and paintings are in the Classicist style.

The Solomon Room, one of the largest of the palace's ground-floor interiors, was embellished with a series of paintings depicting the History of Solomon. It comprised six paintings: The Dream of Solomon (plafond), The Queen of Sheba before Solomon, The Judgment of Solomon, Consultation with King Hiram (friezes), Dedication of the Temple and Solomon's Sacrifice (walls). They were executed for Stanislaus Augustus in 1791–93 by Marcello Bacciarelli and depicted the monarch himself as the biblical king. All these paintings were deliberately and completely destroyed by the Germans in 1944 (burned in a fire before the palace) during the preparations to blow up the building. On the first floor are the royal apartments, the upper picture gallery, the balcony room, the king's cabinet, the royal bed chambers, the cloakroom, and the officer's room.

In the years 2012–2015, the palace underwent further renovations, which covered the roof as well as all the rooms of the palace including the Ball Room in which 17th-century wall paintings by Jan Bogumił Plersch were unveiled. In 2016, the palace and park received an estimated 2.1 million visitors.

Gallery

See also
 Baroque in Poland
 Polish classicism
 List of most visited palaces and monuments

Notes

Further reading
 Władysław Tatarkiewicz, Łazienki warszawskie (Warsaw's Łazienki), [with photographs by] Edmund Kupiecki, Warsaw, Wydawnictwo Arkady, 1968.  (Polish-language text, with summaries in English, French, and Russian.)
 Władysław Tatarkiewicz, Łazienki królewskie i ich osobliwości (The Royal Baths and Their Curiosities), [with photographs by] Krzysztof Jabłoński, Warsaw, Wydawnictwo Arkady, 1986, .  (Polish-language text, with summaries in English, French, German, and Russian.)

External links

  Official site
  Lubomirski's Bathhouse

Palaces in Warsaw
Residences of Polish monarchs
Royal residences in Poland
Neoclassical architecture in Warsaw
Neoclassical palaces
Houses completed in 1689
Registered museums in Poland
Museums in Warsaw
Historic house museums in Poland
1680s in Poland
1689 establishments in Europe
17th-century establishments in Poland